Narayan Singh Dewal (born 5 August 1964) is a Member of the Legislative Assembly (MLA) from Raniwara, in Rajasthan, India. He is a member of the Bharatiya Janata Party and was elected as an MLA in 2013 as a candidate of that party, with a margin of 32,652 votes.

References

External links

Biography

1964 births
Living people
People from Jalore district
Rajasthani politicians
Bharatiya Janata Party politicians from Rajasthan
Use Indian English from November 2016
All stub articles
All Wikipedia articles written in Indian English
Use dmy dates from November 2016
Rajasthan MLAs 2018–2023